Swansea is an electoral district of the Legislative Assembly in the Hunter Region of the Australian state of New South Wales. It is represented by Yasmin Catley of the Labor Party.

Swansea is situated between Lake Macquarie and the Pacific Ocean in southeastern City of Lake Macquarie and northeastern Central Coast Council. It includes Swansea and extends as far north as Valentine, Belmont North and Jewells and as far south as San Remo and Budgewoi.

Swansea was created in 1981 and has usually been held by Labor.

Members for Swansea

Election results

References

Swansea
Swansea
Electoral District of Swansea
City of Lake Macquarie